Jurewicz is a Polish-language surname. It is most frequent in north-eastern Poland. It is related to surnames in other languages:

People 
Bryan Jurewicz, American football player
Chodko Jurewicz (fl. 1422–1447), Lithuanian nobleman
Chris Jay born Chris Jurewicz
Mike Jurewicz (born 1945), American baseball player
Theodore Jurewicz (born 1953), Polish-American Orthodox old-rite priest and artist specializing in painting Byzantine icons and frescoes
John Jurewicz, son of Theodore and Polish-American artist specializing in painting Byzantine icons and frescoes.

References 

Polish-language surnames
Patronymic surnames
Surnames from given names